James McLachlan (August 1, 1852 – November 21, 1940) was an American educator and politician who served six terms as a U.S. Representative from California.

Early life 
On August 1, 1852, McLachlan was born in Argyllshire, Scotland.
McLachlan  immigrated to the United States in 1855 with his parents and settled in Tompkins County, New York.
McLachlan worked on a farm and attended the public schools.

Education 
In 1878, McLachlan graduated from Hamilton College in Clinton, New York. McLachlan studied law.

Career 
McLachlan was a teacher in the public schools.

McLachlan was elected school commissioner of Tompkins County, New York, in 1877.
He was admitted to practice before the Supreme Court of New York in 1880.
McLachlan practiced law in Ithaca, New York from 1881 to 1888.

In 1888, McLachlan continued his law  practice in Pasadena, California. In 1890, McLachlan served as District Attorney in Los Angeles County. McLachlan's term ended in 1892.

On November 6, 1894 McLachlan was elected as a Republican to the United States House, defeating Democrat George S. Patton. McLachlan served in the Fifty-fourth Congress (March 4, 1895 – March 3, 1897).
In 1896, McLachlan was an unsuccessful candidate for reelection to the Fifty-fifth Congress.

McLachlan was elected to the Fifty-seventh and to the four succeeding Congresses (March 4, 1901 – March 3, 1911).
He was an unsuccessful candidate for reelection in 1910 to the Sixty-second Congress.
He resumed the practice of his profession in Los Angeles, California, served as a member of the National Monetary Commission in 1911 and 1912.

Personal life 
In 1888, McLachlan moved to Pasadena, California.
On November 21, 1940, McLachlan died in Los Angeles, California.
He is interred at Forest Lawn Memorial Park in Glendale, California.

See also 
 1894 United States House of Representatives elections in California

References

Additional sources 
 

1852 births
1940 deaths
District attorneys in California
Republican Party members of the United States House of Representatives from California
Scottish emigrants to the United States